Jack's Diner (now "Lanna Thai Diner") is a historic diner at 901 Main Street in Woburn, Massachusetts.  Built in 1952 by the Worcester Lunch Car Company as #834, it is believed to be the only surviving stainless steel diner built by the company that is located in Massachusetts.  It is located on a site that has housed a diner since at least 1937, when the Worcester Lunch Car Company also delivered a diner to this site.  The original diner was called Shipper's Diner, but the one delivered in 1952 was known as Jack's.  The proprietor of the establishment is not listed in city directories.  By 1975 the diner had been renamed Stella's; as of 2011 it houses a Thai restaurant.

The diner was added to the National Register of Historic Places in 2000.

A kitchen fire on August 26, 2020, led to the temporary closing of the Lanna Thai Diner.

See also
National Register of Historic Places listings in Middlesex County, Massachusetts

References

Diners on the National Register of Historic Places
Diners in Massachusetts
Restaurants on the National Register of Historic Places in Massachusetts
Woburn, Massachusetts
Buildings and structures in Middlesex County, Massachusetts
Restaurants established in 1952
Commercial buildings completed in 1952
National Register of Historic Places in Middlesex County, Massachusetts
1952 establishments in Massachusetts